Heosemys is a genus of freshwater turtles ("terrapins" in British English) in the family Geoemydidae (formerly called Bataguridae).  The genus Heosemys was split out of the related genus Geoemyda by McDowell in 1964.

Species
Four species are placed under Heosemys:
 Arakan forest turtle (Boulenger, 1903), Heosemys depressa
 Giant Asian pond turtle (Gray, 1860), Heosemys grandis
 Spiny turtle (Gray, 1831), Heosemys spinosa
 Yellow-headed temple turtle (Anderson, 1875), Heosemys annandalii

Some other species, initially placed here also, are now in different genera. The Sulawesi forest turtle is now classified under Leucocephalon, the Philippine forest turtle under Siebenrockiella, and the Cochin Forest cane turtle under Vijayachelys.

References

External links

 
 Key to identifying Heosemys species

 
Reptiles of Bangladesh
Turtle genera
Taxa named by Leonhard Stejneger